A mobile manipulator is a robot system built from a robotic manipulator arm mounted on a mobile platform. Such systems unite the advantages of mobile platforms and robotic manipulator arms and reduce their drawbacks. For instance, the mobile platform extends the workspace of the arm, whereas an arm offers several operational functionalities.

Description 

A mobile manipulation system offers a dual advantage of mobility offered by a mobile platform and dexterity offered by the manipulator. The mobile platform offers extended workspace to the manipulator. The extra degrees of freedom of the mobile platform also provide user with more choices. However, the operation of such a system is challenging because of the many degrees of freedom and the unstructured environment that it performs in.

General system composition:
 Mobile platform
 Robot manipulator
 Vision
 Tooling

Motivation 
At the moment mobile manipulation is a subject of major focus in development and research environments, and
mobile manipulators, either autonomous or teleoperated, are used in many areas, e.g. space exploration, military operations, home-care and health-care. However, within the industrial field the implementation of mobile manipulators has been limited, although the needs for intelligent and flexible automation are present. In addition, the necessary technology entities (mobile platforms, robot manipulators, vision and tooling) are, to a large extent, available off-the-shelf components.

A reason for this is that the manufacturing industries act traditionally and, therefore, have reluctance in
taking risks by implementing new technologies. Also, within the field of industrial mobile manipulation the
centre of attention has been on optimization of the individual technologies, especially robot manipulators
 and tooling, while the integration, use and application have been neglected. This means that few implementations of mobile robots, in production environments, have been reported – e.g. and.

Timeline

State of the art 

One recent example is the mobile manipulator "Little Helper" from the Department of Production at Aalborg University.

See also 
 Cyber-physical system
 Home automation
 Remote manipulator
 Robotic arm

Notes and references

External links

Robotic manipulation
 
Articles containing video clips